Frank William Orr (6 March 1879 – 18 June 1967) was an English first-class cricketer.

Orr was born at Marylebone in March 1879. He was educated at Tonbridge School, before studying law at Brasenose College, Oxford. After graduating from Oxford, he became a solicitor. He made a single appearance in first-class cricket for the P. F. Warner's XI against the touring Gentlemen of Philadelphia at The Oval in 1903. Batting twice in the match, he was dismissed for 2 runs by Percy Clark in the P. F. Warner's XI first-innings, while in their second-innings he was dismissed for 28 runs by Bart King. Orr died at Wandsworth in June 1967.

References

External links

1879 births
1967 deaths
People from Marylebone
People educated at Tonbridge School
Alumni of Brasenose College, Oxford
English cricketers
P. F. Warner's XI cricketers
English solicitors